Activated alumina is manufactured from aluminium hydroxide by dehydroxylating it in a way that produces a highly porous material; this material can have a surface area significantly over 200 m²/g.  The compound is used as a desiccant (to keep things dry by adsorbing water from the air) and as a filter of fluoride, arsenic and selenium in drinking water. It is made of aluminium oxide (alumina; Al2O3). It has a very high surface-area-to-weight ratio, due to the many "tunnel like" pores that it has. Activated alumina in its phase composition can be represented only by metastable forms (gamma-Al2O3 etc.). Corundum (alpha-Al2O3), the only stable form of aluminum oxide, does not have such a chemically active surface and is not used as a sorbent.

Uses

Catalyst applications
Activated alumina is used for a wide range of adsorbent and catalyst applications including the adsorption of catalysts in polyethylene production, in hydrogen peroxide production, as a selective adsorbent for many chemicals including arsenic, fluoride, in sulfur removal from fluid streams (Claus Catalyst process).

Desiccant
Used as a desiccant, it works by a process called adsorption.  The water in the air actually sticks to the alumina itself in between the tiny passages as the air passes through them.  The water molecules become trapped so that the air is dried out as it passes through the filter.  This process is reversible.  If the alumina desiccant is heated to ~200 °C, it will release the trapped water.  This process is called regenerating the desiccant.

Fluoride adsorbent
Activated alumina is also widely used to remove fluoride from drinking water. In the US, there are widespread programs to fluoridate drinking water.  However, in certain regions, such as the Rajasthan region of India, there is enough fluoride in the water to cause fluorosis. A study from the Harvard school of Public Health found exposure to high levels of fluoride as a child correlated with lower IQ.

Activated alumina filters can easily reduce fluoride levels from 10 ppm to less than 1 ppm. The amount of fluoride leached from the water being filtered depends on how long the water is actually touching the alumina filter media. Basically, the more alumina in the filter, the less fluoride will be in the final, filtered water. Lower temperature water, and lower pH water (acidic water) are filtered more effectively too. Ideal pH for treatment is 5.5, which allows for up to a 95% removal rate.

As per researches conducted by V.K.Chhabra, Chief Chemist (retd.) P.H.E.D. Rajasthan, activated alumina, when used as a fluoride filter, under field conditions can best be regenerated by a solution of lye (sodium hydroxide; NaOH), sulfuric acid (H2SO4).

The fluoride uptake capacity (FUC) of activated alumina can be up to 5000 mg/kg. The FUC using V.K. Chhabra's method can be determined as follows:

Fluoride solution: Dissolve 22.1 g anhydrous NaF in distilled water and dilute to 1,000 mL.
1 mL = 10 mg fluoride.
10 mL/L = 100 mg/L fluoride.

Procedure:

To one litre of simulated distilled water containing 100 mg/L of fluoride, agitate at 100 rpm using the jar test machine. Add 10 g of the AA under test. After one hour, switch off the machine and take out the solution. After 5 minutes, carefully decant the supernatant solution and determine the fluoride. Calculate the difference between the original and treated water fluoride concentration. Multiply the difference by 100 to give the fluoride uptake capacity of AA in mg/kg.

Vacuum systems
In high vacuum applications, activated alumina is used as a charge material in fore-line traps to prevent oil generated by rotary vane pumps from back streaming into the system. A baffle of activated alumina can also replace the refrigerated trap often required for diffusion pumps, though this is rarely used.

Biomaterial
Its mechanical properties and non-reactivity in the biological environment allow it to be a suitable material used to cover surfaces in friction in body prostheses (e.g. hip or shoulder prostheses).

Defluoridation

Defluoridation is the downward adjustment of the level of fluoride in drinking water. Activated Alumina process is one of the widely used adsorption methods for the defluoridation of drinking water.

See also
 Activated carbon
 Silica gel
 Synthetic Magnesium Silicate

References

Filters
Desiccants